The European Service Module (ESM) is the service module component of the Orion spacecraft, serving as its primary power and propulsion component until it is discarded at the end of each mission. In January 2013, NASA announced that the European Space Agency (ESA) will contribute the service module for Artemis 1, based on the ESA's Automated Transfer Vehicle (ATV). It was delivered by Airbus Defence and Space in Bremen, in northern Germany to NASA at the end of 2018. After approval of the first module, the ESA will provide the ESMs from Artemis 2 to Artemis 6. 

The module's first flight was Artemis 1, the first major milestone in NASA's Artemis program to return humans to the Moon, on November 16, 2022. The Space Launch System launched Orion toward the Moon, where the ESM placed the spacecraft into distant retrograde orbit around the moon, and subsequently extracted it from that orbit and sent it back to Earth.

The service module supports the crew module from launch through separation prior to reentry. It provides in-space propulsion capability for orbital transfer, attitude control, and high altitude ascent aborts. It provides the water and oxygen needed for a habitable environment, generates and stores electrical power, and maintains the temperature of the vehicle's systems and components. This module can also transport unpressurized cargo and scientific payloads.

History

Initial design

Roughly cylindrical in shape, the original American-designed Orion service module, like the crew module, would have been constructed of Al-Li alloy (to keep weight down), and would have featured a pair of deployable decagonal solar panels, similar in design to the panels used on the Mars Phoenix lander. The panels, the first to be used on a U.S. crewed spacecraft (except for a 10-year period, the Soviet/Russian Soyuz spacecraft has used them since the first mission in 1967), would allow NASA to eliminate the need to carry malfunction-prone fuel cells, and their associated hardware (mainly LH2 tanks) in the service module, resulting in a shorter, yet more maneuverable spacecraft. Successful initial testing of an Orion solar array design using full-scale "UltraFlex wing" hardware was reported in October, 2008.

The Orion Main Engine (OME) was a  thrust, pressure-fed, regeneratively cooled, storable bi-propellant rocket engine to be made by Aerojet. The OME was an increased performance version of the  thrust rocket engine used by the Space Shuttle for its Orbital Maneuvering System (OMS). The SM Reaction Control System (RCS), the spacecraft's maneuvering thrusters (originally based on the Apollo "quad" system, but resembling that used on Gemini), would also be pressure-fed, and would use the same propellants. NASA believed the SM RCS would be able to act as a backup for a trans-Earth injection (TEI) burn in case the main SM engine failed.

A pair of LOX tanks (similar to those used in the Apollo service module) would provide, along with small tanks of nitrogen, the crew with breathing air at sea-level or "cruising altitude" pressure (1 or 0.7 atm), with a small "surge tank" providing necessary life support during reentry and touchdown. Lithium hydroxide (LiOH) cartridges would recycle the spacecraft's environmental system by "scrubbing" the carbon dioxide (CO2) exhaled by the astronauts from ship's air and adding fresh oxygen and nitrogen, which was then cycled back out into the system loop. Because of the switch from fuel cells to solar panels, the service module would have an onboard water tank to provide drinking water for the crew, and (when mixed with glycol), cooling water for the spacecraft's electronics. Unlike the practice during Apollo of dumping both water and urine overboard during the flight, the Orion would have an onboard recycling system, identical to that used on the International Space Station, to convert both waste water and urine into both drinking and cooling water.

The service module also mounted the spacecraft's waste heat management system (its radiators) and the aforementioned solar panels. These panels, along with backup batteries located in the Orion CM, would provide in-flight power to the ship's systems. The voltage, 28 volts DC, was similar to that used on the Apollo spacecraft during flight.

The Orion service module would be encapsulated by fiberglass shrouds jettisoned at the same time as the LES/Boost Protective Cover, which would take place roughly 2 minutes after launch (30 seconds after the solid rocket first stage was jettisoned). Prior to the "Orion 606" redesign, the Orion SM resembled a squat, enlarged version of the Apollo service module. The "Orion 606" SM design retained the  width for the attachments of the Orion M with the Orion CM, but utilized a Soyuz-like service module design to allow Lockheed Martin to make the vehicle lighter in weight and permitting the attachment of the decagonal solar panels at the module's midpoints, instead of at the base near the spacecraft/rocket adapter, which might have subjected the panels to damage.

ATV-based module

A review of the Constellation program in 2009 by the new Augustine Commission prompted by the new Obama administration had found that five years in, the service module development program was already running four years behind its 2020 lunar target and was woefully underfunded. The only element worth continuing was the Crew Exploration Vehicle in the role of a space station escape capsule. This led in 2010 to the Administration cancelling the programme by withdrawing funding in the proposed 2011 budget. A public outcry led to the programme being frozen rather than outright cancelled and a review launched in to how costs could be cut, which found that it was possible to continue if there was an emphasis on finding alternate funding, reducing the complexity by narrowing the scope to focus on the Moon and deep space rather than Mars, and by reusing existing hardware, reducing the range of equipment requiring development. The Ares I launcher intended for crew flights had significant design issues such as being overweight and prone to dangerous vibration, and in the case of a catastrophic failure its blast radius exceeded the escape system's ejection range. Its role as the Orion launch vehicle was replaced by the Space Launch System, and the three different Crew Exploration Vehicle designs were merged in to a single Multipurpose Crew Exploration Vehicle.

In May 2011 the European Space Agency (ESA) Director General announced a possible collaboration with NASA to work on a successor to ESA's Automated Transfer Vehicle (ATV). ESA's provision of this successor could be counted towards its 8% share of the operating costs of the International Space Station (ISS); the ATV missions resupplying the station only covered this obligation up to 2017. On 21 June 2012, Astrium announced that it had been awarded two separate studies to evaluate possible future missions building on the technology and experience gained from its development of ATV and the Columbus laboratory. The first study looked into the construction of a service module which would be used in tandem with the Orion capsule. The second examined the production of a versatile multi-purpose orbital vehicle. Each study was worth €6.5 million.

In November 2012, ESA obtained the commitment of its member states for it to construct an ATV-derived service module for Orion, to fly on the maiden flight of the Space Launch System, thereby meeting ESA's budgetary obligation to NASA regarding the ISS for 2017–20. No decision was made about supplying the module for later Orion flights.

In January 2013, NASA announced its agreement, made the preceding December, that ESA would build the service module for Exploration Mission-1 (renamed Artemis 1), then scheduled to take place in 2017. This service module was not required for Exploration Flight Test-1 in 2014, as this used a test service module supplied by Lockheed Martin. On 17 November 2014 ESA signed a €390 million fixed price contract with Airbus Defence and Space for the development and construction of the first ATV-based service module. In December 2016, ESA's member states agreed it would extend its commitment to the ISS to 2024, and would supply a second service module, as part of the resulting budgetary obligation.

The new design for the solar arrays, replacing ATK's decagonal (labeled "circular") UltraFlex design, is by Airbus Defence and Space, whose subsidiary, Airbus Defence and Space Netherlands (then known as Dutch Space), built the ATV's X-shaped array of four panels. The ATV's array generated 4.6 kilowatts. The upgraded version for the service module will generate about 11 kilowatts, and will span about  when extended.

In September 2015, Thales Alenia Space signed a contract with Airbus Defence and Space to develop and produce thermomechanical systems for the service module, including structure and micrometeoroid protection, thermal control and consumable storage and distribution.

Lockheed Martin is building the two adapters, connecting the service module to the crew module and to the upper stage of the Space Launch System, and also the three fairing panels that are jettisoned after protecting the service module during launch and ascent.

On 16 February 2017 a €200m contract was signed between Airbus and the European Space Agency for the production of a second European service module for use on the first crewed Orion flight.

From 2018 
On 26 October 2018 the first unit for Artemis 1 was assembled in full at Airbus Defence and Space's factory in Bremen.

The service module's main engine for Artemis 1 will be a Space Shuttle Orbital Maneuvering System (OMS) AJ10-190 engine left over from the Space Shuttle program, in which it flew on 19 missions and carried out 89 burns. It is intended that the OMS will be used for the first three (or five ) service modules and four alternate engine designs are under consideration for later flights, thought to include the AJ10-118k; used for the second stage of the Delta II it is a lighter and more powerful version in the same AJ10 engine family whose lineage began with the Vanguard.

In comparison with the Apollo command and service module, which previously took astronauts to the Moon, the European Service Module generates approximately twice as much electricity (11.2 kW vs 6.3 kW), weighs nearly 40% less when fully fuelled (15,461 kg, vs 24,520 kg) and is roughly the same size (4 m in length excluding engine and 4.1 m vs 3.9 m in diameter) supporting the environment for a slightly (45%) larger habitable volume on the crew module (8.95 m3 vs 6.17 m3) though it will carry 50% less propellant for orbital maneuvers (8,600 kg usable propellant vs 18,584 kg).

The ESM will be able to support a crew of four for 21 days against the 14 day endurance for the three-man Apollo.

In November 2019, ESA member states approved the financing of ESMs for Artemis 3 and 4. In May 2020 the contract between Airbus and the European Space Agency for the production of a third European Service Module was signed.

In October 2020, ESA and NASA sign a Memorandum of understanding which includes the provision by ESA of ESM-4 and ESM-5 as a participation in the Gateway, allowing three flights of European astronauts to Lunar orbit between 2025 and 2030.

In February 2021, the contract between Airbus and the European Space Agency to provide ESM-4 to ESM-6 was signed.

Specifications

European Service Module models

References

External links
Orion Spacecraft at NASA
Orion at ESA
European Service Module at Airbus Defence and Space

Orion (spacecraft)
Constellation program
Proposed European Space Agency spacecraft